Amar Singh Rathore (30 December 1613 – 25 July 1644) was the eldest son of Maharaja Gaj Singh of Marwar in seventeenth-century India.

After he was disinherited and exiled by his family, he entered the Mughals' service. His legendary bravery and battle prowess resulted in elevation to a high rank in the imperial nobility and personal recognition by the emperor, who made him the subedar (governor) of a region that was directly ruled by the emperor himself, Nagaur. 

In 1644, he was enraged by an attempt by the emperor to levy a fine on him for an unauthorized absence. In the emperor's presence, he stabbed and killed Salabat Khan,  who had been asked to collect the fine. He is celebrated in some popular ballads of Rajasthan, Western Uttar Pradesh and Punjab.

Family
Amar Singh was born 11 December 1613 as the son of Kunwar Gaj Singh, eldest son of Raja Sur Singh of Marwar. His mother was Rani Sanagari Mansukhdeji, daughter of Sangaro Cahuvan Jasvant of Pali.

Life 
On the death of his father, the throne of Marwar was given to his 11 year old younger half brother, Jaswant Singh, as per his father's wish. This was due to Gaj Singh being extremely fond Jaswant's mother, Pratap Devi and also due to the influence his patar, Anara Bai, who was on bad terms with Amar Singh. He instead received the pargana of Nagaur and the title of Rao.

Commemoration in popular culture
Amar Singh Rathore is considered an icon of extraordinary might, will and freedom. Neither fear, nor greed were able to affect his decisions. He died as a free man. The bravery of Amar Singh Rathore and Ballu Champavat is still remembered in folk songs in Rajasthan and around Agra. A Hindi movie based on Amar Singh was made in 1970, named 'Veer Amar Singh Rathore' and directed by Radhakant. Dev Kumar, Kumkum and Zeba Rehman were the lead actors of the movie in Black and White. A Gujarati movie was also made on the same subject and the lead role was played by Gujarati actor Upendra Trivedi. A gate of Agra Fort was named after him as 'Amar Singh Gate' which is a major tourist attraction in Agra. A small excerpt from a Punjabi ballad on Amar Singh Rathore describes his angry entry into Shah Jahan's Diwan-i-Khas and Salabat Khan's attempts to hold him back. -

See also
Amar Singh Gate

References

1613 births
1644 deaths
Rajasthani people
Indian warriors
17th-century Indian people